Guthalungra is a rural town and coastal locality in the Whitsunday Region, Queensland, Australia.

Geography 
The northern boundary of the locality is the Coral Sea including the large headland of Cape Upstart rising to  680 metres. The northern half of Cape Upstart is protected as the Cape Upstart National Park. Cape Upstart was named by Lieutenant James Cook on 5 June 1770 during his voyage along the eastern coast of Australia in the HM Bark Endeavour.

Being a coastal locality, much of the land is low-lying but there are a number of peaks, including (from north to south):

 Station Hill 
Nobbies Lookout 
Moosie Hill 
The Maiden Mountain 
Mount Curlewis 
The Seven Sisters 
Mount Carew 

 Mount Abbot 
 Mount Mackenzie 

The Bruce Highway traverses the locality from east to west passing through the town. The North Coast railway line runs almost immediately parallel with the highway with a number of rail stops within the locality (from north to south):

 Broadlands railway stationi, now abandoned 
 Kyburra railway station, now abandonedy
 Guthalungra railway station, serving the town
 Wilmington railway station

The Elliot River flows from south to north through the locality and the town into the Coral Sea to the west of Cape Upstart. The river was named by explorer George Elphinstone Dalrymple after Gilbert Eliott, the first Speaker of the Queensland Legislative Assembly from 1860 to 1870.

History 
The town was named in 1889, using the name of a significant local Aboriginal Australian.

Guthalungra Provisional School opened in 1948, becoming Guthalungra State School on 27 February 1957. The school closed in 1988. It was located on the north side of the Bruce Highway.

Economy 
Guthalungra is predominantly an agricultural area, mostly grazing with some crop production. Pacific Reef Fisheries operate the Guthalungra Prawn Farm near the mouth of the Elliot River. The company uses the farm as a hatchery for black tiger prawns (Penaeus monodon) and a place to conduct their breeding program. The prawns are then raised for harvest and processing at the company's 93 hectare facility at Ayr.

References

External links 

 

Towns in Queensland
Whitsunday Region
Coastline of Queensland
Localities in Queensland